Neoclassical transport, also known as neoclassical diffusion and often associated with banana orbits, is a type of diffusion seen in fusion power reactors that have an overall toroidal layout (like a donut). It is a modification of classical diffusion, adding in effects due to the geometry of the reactor that give rise to new diffusion effects.

Description

Classical transport models a plasma in a magnetic field as a large number of particles traveling in helical paths around a line of force. In typical reactor designs, the lines are roughly parallel, so particles orbiting adjacent lines may collide and scatter. This results in a random walk process which eventually leads to the particles finding themselves outside the magnetic field.

Neoclassical transport adds the effects of the geometry of the fields. In particular, it considers the field inside the tokamak and similar toroidal arrangements, where the field is stronger on the inside curve than the outside simply due to the magnets being closer together in that area. To even out these forces, the field as a whole is twisted into a helix, so that the particles alternately move from the inside to the outside of the reactor.

In this case, as the particle transits from the outside to the inside, it sees an increasing magnetic force. If the particle energy is low, this increasing field may cause the particle to reverse directions, as in a magnetic mirror. The particle now travels in the reverse direction through the reactor, to the outside limit, and then back towards the inside where the same reflection process occurs. This leads to a population of particles bouncing back and forth between two points, tracing out a path that looks like a banana from above, the so-called banana orbits.

Since any particle in the long tail of the Maxwell–Boltzmann distribution is subject to this effect, there is always some natural population of such banana particles. Since these travel in the reverse direction for half of their orbit, their drift behavior is oscillatory in space. Therefore, when the particles collide, their average step size (width of the banana) is much larger than their gyroradius, leading to neoclassical diffusion across the magnetic field.

See also
Wendelstein 7-X

References
 

Fusion power
Transport phenomena
Diffusion
Tokamaks